Hyperion is a 1989 science fiction novel by American author Dan Simmons. The first book of his Hyperion Cantos series, it won the Hugo Award for best novel.

The plot of the novel features multiple time-lines and characters. It follows a similar structure to The Canterbury Tales by Geoffrey Chaucer. The next book in the series was The Fall of Hyperion, published in 1990.

Plot

Premise
In the 29th century, the Hegemony of Man comprises hundreds of planets connected by farcaster portals. The Hegemony maintains an uneasy alliance with the TechnoCore, a civilization of AIs. Modified humans known as Ousters live in space stations between stars and are engaged in conflict with the Hegemony.

Numerous "Outback" planets have no farcasters and cannot be accessed without incurring significant time dilation. One of these planets is Hyperion, home to structures known as the Time Tombs, which are moving backwards in time and guarded by a legendary creature known as the Shrike. On the eve of an Ouster invasion of Hyperion, a final pilgrimage to the Time Tombs has been organized. The pilgrims decide that they will each tell their tale of how they were chosen for the pilgrimage.

Part One, The Priest's Tale: "The Man who Cried God"

Paul Duré and Lenar Hoyt are Catholic priests. Duré is exiled to Hyperion. He researches an isolated civilization known as the Bikura. Duré deduces that the Bikura have been infected with cross-shaped parasites called cruciforms. After death, the cruciform rebuilds the physical body and resurrects them. Duré encounters the Shrike and is infected with a cruciform.

Severe pain prevents Duré from either cutting out the cruciform or leaving the Bikura; his journal entries end. Hoyt reveals that Duré crucified himself to a tesla tree in a desperate attempt to rid himself of the cruciform. For seven years, Father Duré had been continually electrocuted and resurrected. As Hoyt touches Duré, the cruciform falls from his body and allows him finally to die. The Bikura are destroyed with nuclear weapons, but not before Hoyt is infected with both Duré's cruciform and one of his own.

Part Two, The Soldier's Tale: "The War Lovers"
Colonel Fedmahn Kassad's tale begins with a flashback to his days training in the FORCE military academy on Mars. During a simulation battle, a mysterious woman saves Kassad and becomes his lover.

Kassad hijacks an Ouster shuttle and crashes it onto Hyperion. There he is reunited with his lover Moneta. Kassad sees the Tree of Pain, a gigantic steel tree on which the Shrike impales its victims. Moneta and the Shrike teach him to use time-altering abilities in combat. Kassad realizes that Moneta and the Shrike have been manipulating him and wish to use him to spark an interstellar war in which billions of people will die. After Kassad is rescued, he becomes an anti-war activist.

Part Three, The Poet's Tale: "Hyperion Cantos"
Martin Silenus trained as a poet, but his training was interrupted when a black hole destroyed Earth. Silenus is forced to work as a laborer. During this time, he starts work on his Hyperion Cantos, his magnum opus. His Dying Earth series becomes an enormous hit, making him a multi-billionaire.

Silenus joins Sad King Billy on Hyperion. Billy is an aristocrat who decides to relocate to Hyperion and establish a kingdom of artists. Silenus resumes work on the Cantos and becomes convinced that the Shrike is his muse. Billy burns the Cantos manuscript and is taken away by the Shrike. In the centuries since, reliant on life-extending treatments, Silenus has been waiting to return to Hyperion to finish the poem.

Part Four, The Scholar's Tale: "The River Lethe's Taste Is Bitter"

Sol Weintraub, a Jewish professor, is present on the pilgrimage with his infant daughter Rachel. Twenty years ago, Sol's adult daughter became an archaeologist and went to Hyperion. While mapping one of the Tombs, the Shrike appears; Rachel contracts a disease which causes her to age backwards. Sol wrestles for years with dreams in which he is ordered to go to Hyperion and sacrifice Rachel in a replay of the Binding of Isaac. He decides to become a pilgrim and to implore the Shrike for a cure. 

After hearing Weintraub's tale, the party retires outside to gaze at the stars. There, they see the Templar treeship which carried them to Hyperion destroyed by Ousters. The ship's captain (who is also on the pilgrimage), Het Masteen, does not react and retires to his room without speaking. In the morning, Masteen is missing and his room is found full of blood, despite a watch that has been kept all night.

Part Five, The Detective's Tale: "The Long Good-Bye"
Brawne Lamia is a private investigator. Her current client is a cybrid (a human body controlled by a TechnoCore AI) named Johnny. She and Johnny are forcibly farcast to a planet that seems to be a perfect replica of Old Earth. They become lovers. Lamia and Johnny undertake a virtual reality heist on the TechnoCore. They discover that the Core AIs are divided by their varying loyalty to the Core's Ultimate Intelligence (UI) project. Some members of the Core plan to create an omniscient AI: in essence, a god.

Johnny is killed in an ambush, but not before he transfers his consciousness into an implant in Lamia's skull. It is revealed that Lamia is pregnant with Johnny's baby. She is rescued by Shrike cultists, and granted asylum by the Church of The Shrike under the condition that she will embark on the pilgrimage.

Part Six, The Consul's Tale: "Remembering Siri"

The Consul tells the story of Merin Aspic and Siri. Aspic engages in several voyages aboard a spaceship to build a farcaster portal on Maui-Covenant, connecting it to the Hegemony and its waiting hordes of tourists. Eventually he falls in love with Siri. Each time they meet, Merin and Siri age at different speeds due to time dilation. This difference grows more pronounced until the eighth visit, in which Merin returns to find Siri dead of old age and the farcaster ready to be activated. Merin chooses to sabotage the farcaster, beginning a hopeless resistance against the Hegemony. In crushing the rebellion, the military destroys the ecology as thoroughly as the tourists would have. The Consul reveals that Siri and Merin were his grandparents. He bides his time, waiting for a chance to betray the Hegemony and achieve revenge. The Consul reveals that he triggered an Ouster device which led to the emptying of the Time Tombs and the release of the Shrike, knowing that doing so would likely cause the destruction of humanity.

Epilogue

The pilgrims decide to continue their journey to meet the Shrike. The narrative abruptly ends as they approach the Time Tombs, which now emit an unusual glow, across the desert plain.

Characters
 The Consul is the former planetary governor of Hyperion. He is enigmatic for much of the first novel, observing and recording the stories of the other Shrike Pilgrims but reluctant to share his own. He is one of only a few thousand individuals to own a private starship.
 Lenar Hoyt is a Roman Catholic priest in his early 30s, in a universe where Catholicism claims only a few thousand followers.
 Fedmahn Kassad is a Martian colonel in the Hegemony's FORCE military, of Palestinian descent.
 Brawne Lamia is a private detective. Her name derives from a combination of Fanny Brawne, the love of John Keats, and the eponymous creature of his Lamia and Other Poems. Brawne is the daughter of Senator Byron Lamia, once a friend of CEO Meina Gladstone's, who apparently committed suicide when Brawne was a child.
 Martin Silenus is a foul-mouthed poet. Born on Earth before its destruction, he is incredibly old. Like Keats, he is working on an unfinished epic poem.
 Sol Weintraub is a Jewish scholar. His daughter was afflicted with an illness dubbed the "Merlin Sickness" that caused her to age backwards: she gets younger as time progresses.
 Het Masteen is the most mysterious of all seven pilgrims. He is a Templar (a nature priest) who captains the treeship that brings the pilgrims to Hyperion.
 The Shrike is a menacing and immensely powerful creature of uncertain origin and motives which appears throughout the narrative. It is known for impaling people on a massive metal tree. It is named after the bird of the same name, which impales insects and small animals on branches. The pilgrims expect to find the Shrike in the Time Tombs, which are the ultimate destination of their journey, but as they tell their individual tales it becomes clear that the creature is already connected to each of them. 
 Meina Gladstone is the CEO and Commander in Chief of the Hegemony of Man, residing on Tau Ceti Center.

Background
In the 1970s, Simmons was an elementary school teacher in a small town in Missouri. He began telling stories to his pupils, which eventually grew to become The Death of a Centaur in Prayers to Broken Stones. This was the first story set in the universe of Hyperion.

Reception
Hyperion was well received critically. The New York Times praised its literary references, its format, and its treatment of the Ultimate Intelligences. Other reviews call it a cult classic, praising Simmons's worldbuilding and character development. Some reviewers enjoyed the way that the six central stories weave together to create a cohesive novel, but others have criticized the fact that most of the story takes place during flashbacks, leaving limited room for plot advancement.

Awards
The novel won the 1990 Hugo Award for Best Novel and the 1990 Locus Award for Best Novel. It was nominated for the 1991 BSFA Award for Best Novel. With its sequel The Fall of Hyperion, it was nominated for the 1992 Arthur C. Clarke Award

Adaptations
In 2009, Scott Derrickson was set to direct Hyperion Cantos for Warner Bros. and Graham King, with Trevor Sands penning the script to blend Hyperion and The Fall of Hyperion into one film.  In 2011, actor Bradley Cooper expressed interest in taking over the adaptation. On June 10, 2015 it was announced that TV channel Syfy will produce a mini-series based on the Hyperion Cantos with the involvement of Cooper and King. In November 2021, it was announced that Warner Bros. and Bradley Cooper would instead be developing Hyperion as a film.

References

External links

 Hyperion at Worlds Without End

Hyperion Cantos 
1989 science fiction novels
American science fiction novels
Doubleday (publisher) books
Frame stories
Hugo Award for Best Novel-winning works
Novels about virtual reality
Novels by Dan Simmons
Fiction set around Tau Ceti
Teleportation in fiction
Nonlinear narrative novels
Novels set on fictional planets